See also Menominee River

The Menomonee River is one of three primary rivers in Milwaukee, Wisconsin, along with the Kinnickinnic River and Milwaukee River.

Description
Named after the Menomonee (also spelled Menominee) Indians, the word was given to the Menomonee people by the Chippewa people, and in the Chippewa language literally means "rice eaters" referring to the abundant wild rice that once grew along its shores in the Menomonee Valley. A tributary of the Milwaukee River, it is the most industrialized within the Milwaukee River Basin.

Watershed

Not to be confused with longer rivers named after the same Indian tribe. This includes portions of Washington, Ozaukee, Waukesha, and Milwaukee counties. A large swath of the river has been heavily channelized and industrialized as it runs through the Menomonee Valley. This has become a primary source of pollution for the river.

Its estuary empties into Lake Michigan from the Milwaukee River near the Milwaukee harbor, along with the Kinnickinnic River to the south.

Parks

References

External links

Menomonee River at Milwaukee Riverkeeper
Menomonee River at Great Lakes Tributary Modeling Program
Menomonee Valley Partners

Rivers of Washington County, Wisconsin
Rivers of Waukesha County, Wisconsin
Rivers of Milwaukee County, Wisconsin
Geography of Milwaukee
Rivers of Wisconsin
Tributaries of Lake Michigan